Bangkok Christian College (BCC)() is a private boys' school in the financial district of Si Lom, Bangkok. The school has a longstanding reputation as one of the most prestigious and highly selective schools in Thailand.

Bangkok Christian College was established on 30 September 1852 by American Presbyterian missionaries. Bangkok Christian College is the oldest school in Thailand. Originally in Thonburi, the school moved to its present site in Bang Rak District in 1902.

The school has about 400 academic staff, both Thai and foreigner, and 6,000 students in 12 grades. Although it is a Christian school, only about five percent of students are Christians. Most students are Buddhist, but it is popular with students of all faiths due to its strong reputation.

History
Bangkok Christian College, the first private boys school in the Kingdom of Thailand, was founded on 30 September 1852, in tambons Koodeechine and Samray, Thonburi, with the blessing of King Rama IV. In 1902, the school was moved to Pramuan Road. King Rama V donated 20 chang to help defray the cost of land for the development of the new campus.

Intensive English Program 
The BCC Intensive English Program (IEP) was created in 2002 to increase students' ability to understand and use English confidently and effectively in a range of different contexts. This program will let students learn and practice English with a native speaker.

English Immersion Program (EIP)
Bangkok Christian College took part in one of the first pilot projects for native-English education in Thailand. Commissioned by the Office of Private Education of the Thai Ministry of Education, it has provided an English-Thai bilingual education program to its students since 1995. Beginning with Prathom-1 (Grade 1), it has expanded the EIP by one grade level each year. The school provides a full K-12 program (Prathom-1 to Matthayom-6).

Native English-speaking teachers, as well as the Thai teachers, instruct students in English, mathematics, science, computer technology, health education, physical education, music, and social studies.

School colors 
Bangkok Christian College's school colors are purple and gold. Purple is the color of royalty. It is the combination of red (Thai national color) and blue (the color of the monarchy), so purple signifies the nation and the king. Gold is the color of value. It is mostly yellow, the color of Buddhism, which is the primary religion of Thailand.

Campus
Bangkok Christian College's current campus is in the heart of the city, in Bang Rak, in the Silom District. The school is a one-minute walk from the Surasak BTS skytrain station.

Student management
Bangkok Christian College School separates students in different buildings according to their grade level. Primary students (about 2650) learn at the Ari Semprasat Building or the John A. Eakin Building, junior high school students (about 1325) learn at the M.B. Palmer Building, and senior high school students (about 1325) learn at the BCC 150th Anniversary Building, which is the only building that is separate from the main area of the school. The only way that senior high students can go to the main area during the school time is via a bridge between the M.B. Palmer Building and the 150th Anniversary Building. There are about 400-500 students in each grade, and students are separated into 12 different rooms, with about 30-60 students for room numbers 1-9 and about 23-40 students for room numbers 10–12.

Students are organized in high school according to their program, major, and examination score. Normally, students will learn in that room until they graduate, unlike the primary school and junior high school whose students change rooms every year. Room numbers 1-2 are the "King and Queen Mathematics-Science Class", for students with high scores for their grade in the mathematics-science program; room numbers 3-5 are the "Regular Mathematics-Science Class", for normal students in the mathematics-science program; room numbers 6-7 are the "King and Queen Class" for students with high scores on that grade in the language-math or language-art programs: room number 8 is the "Regular Class" for normal students in the language-math or language-art program: room number 9 is the "Sports Class" for athletes; room number 10 is the "General-Art Class" for students in the general art program; and room numbers 11-14 are the "EIP Class" for students in the EIP program.

Notable alumni
Prime Ministers of Thailand
Pote Sarasin, (21 September - 24 December 1957)
Anand Panyarachun, (7 March 1991 - 7 April 1992) (1st time) and (10 June - 23 September 1992) (2nd time)
Privy Council
Rear Admiral Mom Luang Usni Pramoj
General Pichitr Kullavanijaya
Sawat Wathanakorn

References

External links
Bangkok Christian College Alumni Association

Schools in Bangkok
Boys' schools in Thailand
Christian schools in Thailand
Educational institutions established in 1852
1852 establishments in Siam
Bang Rak district